Kellie Wells may refer to:

 Kellie Wells (athlete) (born 1982), American track and field athlete
 Kellie Wells (writer), American novelist and short story writer

See also
Wells Kelly, musician